Diploma in Computer Science, originally known as the Diploma in Numerical Analysis and Automatic Computing, was a conversion course in computer science offered by the University of Cambridge. It is equivalent to a master's degree in present-day nomenclature but the title diploma was retained for historic reasons, "diploma" being the archaic term for a master's degree.

The diploma was the world's first full-year taught course in computer science, starting in 1953. It attracted students of mathematics, science and engineering. At its peak, there were 50 students on the course. UK government (EPSRC) funding was withdrawn in 2001 and student numbers dropped dramatically. In 2007, the university took the decision to withdraw the diploma at the end of the 2007-08 academical year, after 55 years of service.

History
The introduction of this one-year graduate course was motivated by a University of Cambridge Mathematics Faculty Board Report on the "demand for postgraduate instruction in numerical analysis and automatic computing … [which] if not met, there is a danger that the application to scientific research of the machines now being built will be hampered". The University of Cambridge Computer Laboratory "was one of the pioneers in the development and use of electronic computing-machines (sic)". It had introduced a Summer School in 1950, but the Report noted that "The Summer School deals [only] with 'programming', rather than the general theory of the numerical methods which are programmed." The Diploma "would include theoretical and practical work … [and also] instruction about the various types of computing-machine … and the principles of design on which they are based." With only a few students initially, no extra staff would be needed.

University-supported teaching and research staff in the Laboratory at the time were Maurice Wilkes (head of the laboratory), J. C. P. Miller, W. Renwick, E. N. Mutch, and S. Gill, joined slightly later by C. B. Haselgrove.

In its final incarnation, the Diploma was a 10-month course, evaluated two-thirds on examination and one-third on a project dissertation. Most of the examined courses were shared by the second year ("Part IB") of the undergraduate Computer Science Tripos course, with some additional lectures specifically for the Diploma students and four of the third year undergraduate ("Part II") lecture courses also included.

There were three grades of result from the Diploma: distinction (roughly equivalent to first class honours), pass (equivalent to second or third class honours), and fail.

Notable alumni

 Ann Copestake
 Samson Abramsky
 Ian Bell
 Steve Bourne
 Simon Peyton Jones
 Stan Kelly-Bootle
 Lee Hsien Loong
 Martin Richards
 Simon Tatham
 Bill Thompson
 Eben Upton

References

External links
 University of Cambridge Computer Laboratory

Diploma in Computer Science
1953 in computing
1953 establishments in England
2008 disestablishments in England
Computer science education in the United Kingdom
Engineering and Physical Sciences Research Council
History of computing in the United Kingdom
Diploma in Computer Science